The 2010 Women's British Open was held 29 July to 1 August at Royal Birkdale Golf Club in Southport, England.  It was the 34th edition of the Women's British Open, and the tenth as a major championship on the LPGA Tour.

This was the fifth time the Women's British Open had been held at Royal Birkdale and the second as an LPGA major, previously in 2005. The course had also hosted nine Open Championships, most recently in 2008.

The champion was Yani Tseng of Taiwan at 277 (−11), one stroke ahead of runner-up Katherine Hull of Australia. With the victory, the 21-year-old Tseng became the youngest-ever winner of three major championships.

Past champions in the field

Made the cut

Missed the cut

Course

Source:

Previous length of the course for the Women's British Open (since 2001):
 2005: , par 72

Round summaries

First round
Thursday, 29 July 2010

Second round
Friday, 30 July 2010

Third round
Saturday, 31 July 2010

Final round
Sunday, 1 August 2010

Source:

Scorecard

Cumulative tournament scores, relative to par

References

External links
Ladies European Tour: 2010 Ricoh Women's British Open results
LPGA: 2010 Ricoh Women's British Open results

Women's British Open
Golf tournaments in England
British Open
Women's British Open
Women's British Open
Women's British Open
2010s in Merseyside